Jean-Baptiste Mugiraneza (born February 17, 1991 in Kigali) is a Rwandan footballer, who is currently playing for Kinondoni Municipal Council FC.

Career 
Migi began his career for SC Kiyovu Sport and signed 2007 for league rival APR FC. On 9 February 2009 was linked with a move to famous French club Stade Rennais F.C., after 7 years as APR FC player Mugiraneza jean Baptiste. On 14 July 2015 migi signed for two years with Tanzanian giant Azam F.C. In December 2016, Migi quits Azam FC and joins Gor Mahia for two years.

International career
Mugiraneza is a regular starter on the Rwanda national football team.

International goals
Scores and results list Rwanda's goal tally first.

References

External links
Jean-Baptiste Mugiraneza at Footballdatabase

1991 births
Living people
People from Nyarugenge District
Rwandan footballers
Rwandan expatriate footballers
Rwanda international footballers
Association football midfielders
S.C. Kiyovu Sports players
APR F.C. players
Gor Mahia F.C. players
Azam F.C. players
Kenyan Premier League players
Rwandan expatriate sportspeople in Tanzania
Rwandan expatriate sportspeople in Kenya
Expatriate footballers in Tanzania
Expatriate footballers in Kenya
Rwanda A' international footballers
2011 African Nations Championship players